Kleinwächter is a surname. Notable people with the surname include:

 Friedrich Kleinwächter (1838–1927),  Austrian economist
 Norbert Kleinwächter (born 1986), German politician